CRCR may refer to:

 CRCR - Crooked Rain, Crooked Rain (1994 U.S. album), rock album by Pavement
 CRCR - Crete Carrier Corporation reporting mark, see List of reporting marks: C
 CRCR - "core-to-core transmission", an interprogram communications protocol used by mainframes of Burroughs Medium Systems
 CrCr - double-cream gene in Equine coat color genetics

See also
 CRCR1 aka DCC, the Deleted in Colorectal Cancer
 2CR (disambiguation)
 CR2 (disambiguation)
 CR (disambiguation)